was a cant that was originally used by Japanese court ladies during the Muromachi era, and subsequently spread and came to be thought of as a general women's language. It consisted primarily of a special vocabulary of words for food, clothing, and other household items. Many of the created words were descriptions of the thing they were naming, whether that was a description of a characteristic, shape, color, or usage.

Many nyōbō kotoba words were formed by adding the prefix o-, which indicates politeness, or by dropping part of a word and adding -moji, meaning "character, letter".

Some nyōbō kotoba words passed into general usage, and are today part of the standard Japanese language.

Examples

See also
 Gender differences in spoken Japanese
 Japanese honorifics

References 

Japanese vocabulary
Cant languages
Muromachi period
Gender in language
Women in Japan